Cyperus rheophyticus is a species of sedge that is thought to be endemic to Cameroon.

The species was first formally described by the botanist Kåre Arnstein Lye in 2006.

See also
 List of Cyperus species

References

rheophyticus
Plants described in 2006
Flora of Cameroon
Taxa named by Kåre Arnstein Lye